Varieties of the color yellow may differ in hue, chroma (also called saturation, intensity, or colorfulness) or lightness (or value, tone, or brightness), or in two or three of these qualities. Variations in value are also called tints and shades, a tint being a yellow or other hue mixed with white, a shade being mixed with black.  A large selection of these various colors is shown below.

Computer web color yellow

Yellow (RGB) (X11 yellow) (color wheel yellow)

The color box at right shows the most intense yellow representable in 8-bit RGB color model; yellow is a secondary color in an additive RGB space.

This color is also called color wheel yellow.  It is at precisely 60 degrees on the HSV color wheel, also known as the RGB color wheel (Image of RGB color wheel:).  Its complementary color is blue.

Yellow (CMYK) (process yellow) (canary yellow)

Process yellow (also called pigment yellow or printer's yellow), also known as canary yellow, is one of the three colors typically used as subtractive primary colors, along with magenta and cyan. Canary yellow is derived from the colour of an average canary bird, though canaries can vary in colour from dark yellow to light pink.

Process yellow is not an RGB color, and in the CMYK color model there is no fixed conversion from CMYK primaries to RGB. Different formulations are used for printer's ink, so there can be variations in the printed color that is pure yellow ink.

The first recorded use of canary yellow as a color name in English was in 1789.

Yellow (NCS) (psychological primary yellow)

The color defined as yellow in the NCS or Natural Color System is shown at right (NCS 0580-Y).  The Natural Color System is a color system based on the four unique hues or psychological primary colors red, yellow, green, and blue.  The NCS is based on the opponent process theory of vision.

The “Natural Color System” is widely used in Scandinavia.

Yellow (Munsell)

The color defined as yellow in the Munsell color system (Munsell 5Y) is shown at apex of color wheel.  The Munsell color system is a color space that specifies colors based on three color dimensions: hue, value (lightness), and chroma (color purity), spaced uniformly in three dimensions in the elongated oval at an angle shaped Munsell color solid according to the logarithmic scale which governs human perception.  In order for all the colors to be spaced uniformly, it was found necessary to use a color wheel with five primary colors—red, yellow, green, blue, and purple.

The Munsell colors displayed are only approximate as they have been adjusted to fit into the sRGB gamut.

Yellow (Pantone)

The color that is called yellow in Pantone is displayed at right.

The source of this color is the "Pantone Textile Paper eXtended (TPX)" color list, color #C, EC, M, PC, U, or CP—Yellow.

Yellow (Crayola)

The color yellow in Crayola crayons is displayed at right.

Yellow was one of the original Crayola colors formulated in 1903.

Tints of yellow

Pastel yellow

At right is displayed the color  pastel yellow .

Light yellow

Displayed at right is the web color light yellow.

Cream

Displayed at right is the web color cream, a pale tint of yellow.

Lemon chiffon

Displayed at right is the web color lemon chiffon.

Lemon chiffon is a color that is reminiscent of the color of lemon chiffon cake.

Additional definitions of yellow

Blonde

At right is displayed the color blonde.

Xanthic

The color xanthic is shown at right.

The color "xanthic" is derived from "xantho" (meaning yellow or golden), from the Ancient Greek ξανθός and "ic" (meaning of or pertaining to), from the Ancient Greek adjectival suffix -ικός.

The color "xanthic" is the color of Xanthine and Xanthate, both of which are xanthic acids.

Unmellow yellow

The color unmellow yellow is shown at right.

The color unmellow yellow was formulated by Crayola in 1990.

The color "unmellow yellow" is a similar fluorescent yellow to laser lemon but the color is brighter. In crayons, the color may appear slightly orange, though the computer display can appear more pale depending on one's monitor.

The color is supposed to be fluorescent, but there is no mechanism to display fluorescence on a flat computer screen.

Lemon

Lemon is a color somewhat resembling yellow and named after the fruit. The color lemon is a representation of the color of the outer skin of a lemon.

The first recorded use of lemon as a color name in English was in 1598.

Maximum yellow

Maximum yellow was a Crayola crayon color from 1926 to 1944.

Mellow yellow

The color mellow yellow is displayed at right.

Mellow yellow was first used as a color name in English in 1948 when it was formulated as one of the colors on the Plochere color list.

The source of this color is the Plochere Color System, a color system formulated in 1948 that is widely used by interior designers.

Donovan's album Mellow Yellow, named after the song "Mellow Yellow", was popular during the Summer of Love in 1967.

Royal yellow

At right is displayed the color royal yellow.

The color royal yellow is a representation of the color of the robes worn by the Emperor of China.

The first recorded use of royal yellow as a color name in English was in 1548.  Other names for this color are Chinese yellow and imperial yellow.

Gold (golden)

Gold, also called golden, is a yellow-orange color which is a representation of the color of the element gold.

The web color gold (also referred to as orange-yellow) is sometimes referred to as golden to distinguish it from the color metallic gold. The use of gold as a color term in traditional usage is more often applied to the color "metallic gold".

The first recorded uses of golden as a color name in English were in 1300 to refer to the element gold and in 1423 to refer to blonde hair.

Cyber yellow

The color cyber yellow is displayed at right.

The source of this color is the "Pantone Textile Paper eXtended (TPX)" color list, color 14-0760 TPX—Cyber Yellow.

Safety yellow

Safety yellow is one of the standard high-visibility safety colors defined by ANSI standard Z535, which specifies standards for safety and accident prevention information. It is often used on hazard symbols, warning signs, guard rails, dangerous equipment, and some high-visibility clothing and personal protective equipment. The definition is mirrored in British Standard BS 381C and Australian Standard AS2700 (where it is known as golden yellow). In 1937, it was determined that safety yellow was the best color to be noticed by the human brain; as a result, the paint color of all United States school buses was changed from orange to safety yellow (see also school bus yellow).

Bright yellow (Crayola)

Displayed at right is the color Bright yellow (Crayola). It is the main color on the Indian 200-rupee note.

Greenish Yellow

Displayed at right is the color greenish yellow. It is the main color on the Indian 20-rupee note.

Chartreuse yellow

The first recorded use of chartreuse for the color that is now called chartreuse yellow in American English was in 1892.

In the book Color Standards and Color Nomenclature (1912), "Chartreuse Yellow" is listed and illustrated.

Pear

Pear is a desaturated chartreuse yellow color that resembles the color of the exterior surface of Anjou or Bartlett pears.

Green earth 

Displayed at right is the color green earth. It is also known as terre verte and Verona green. It is an inorganic pigment derived from the minerals celadonite and glauconite.

See also
Lists of colors

References